Robins is a Swedish late-night talk show which premiered on SVT2 on August 23, 2006. The host is the young stand-up comedian Robin Paulsson from Malmö. The show's format is similar to that of other late-night shows, Robin makes jokes about recent news, shows sketches, and talks to a guest in the studio.

One of the most popular sketches in the show features Robin appearing as Swedish football player Zlatan Ibrahimović.

Guests on Robins

Season 1 (2006) 
August 23, 2006: Anders Jansson
August 30, 2006: Allan Svensson
September 6, 2006: Johan Glans and David Batra
September 13, 2006: Tina Thörner
September 20, 2006: Anders Johansson and Måns Nilsson
September 27, 2006: Bengt Frithiofsson
October 4, 2006: Anna Blomberg
October 11, 2006:  Peter Settman
October 18, 2006: Claes af Geijerstam
October 25, 2006: Måns Zelmerlöw

Season 2 (2007) 

April 11, 2007: Bert Karlsson and Peter Magnusson
April 18, 2007: Magnus Betnér and Marie Lindberg
April 25, 2007: Morgan Alling and Lill-Babs
May 2, 2007: Janne Josefsson and Filip Hammar
May 9, 2007: Rikard Palm and Björn Hellberg
May 16, 2007: Annika Andersson and Knut Knutsson
May 23, 2007: Eva Hamilton and Måns Möller

Season 3 (2008)

Season 4 (2009)

References

External links
Robins on svt.se

Sveriges Television original programming
Swedish television talk shows
Late night television programming
2006 Swedish television series debuts
Year of television series ending missing